Yefim Yefimovich Volkov (Russian: Ефим Ефимович Волков; 4 April 1844— 17 February 1920) was a Russian landscape painter.

Biography 
His father was a feldsher and his family was poor. He was briefly employed by the Ministry of Justice. In 1866, he began to take drawing lessons at the "Imperial Society for the Encouragement of the Arts". He later studied at the Imperial Academy of Fine Arts and honed his skills by doing sketches from nature.  In 1870, he received the title of "Free Artist" in recognition of his painting "View of Saint Petersburg and Vicinity".

In 1878, he joined the "Association of Travelling Art Exhibitions" (Peredvizhniki) and presented annual displays of his work under their aegis. The death of his daughter in 1884 caused him several years of grief but, in 1888, he was finally able to make an extensive tour of Greece, Turkey, Egypt and Palestine with his wife, where he painted landscapes with sea views. Later, they toured the Volga region.

He became a full member of the Academy in 1895 and was named an Academician four years later. After the events of Bloody Sunday, the Peredvizhniki came under police scrutiny, interest in their work began to decline and Volkov's career never recovered. He died in "genteel poverty" at his home on Vasilievsky Island.

Selected paintings

References

Further reading
 Natalya Vassilyeva, Sergey Istomin; Ефим Волков, (Master Artists Series) Белый город (2007)  Selections from the book

External links 

 ArtNet: More works by Volkov

1844 births
1920 deaths
Landscape painters
19th-century painters from the Russian Empire
Russian male painters
20th-century Russian painters
19th-century male artists from the Russian Empire
20th-century Russian male artists